René Wiriath (1 December 1899 – 28 March 1942) was a French middle-distance runner. He competed in the men's 800 metres at the 1924 Summer Olympics.

References

External links
 

1899 births
1942 deaths
Athletes (track and field) at the 1924 Summer Olympics
French male middle-distance runners
Olympic athletes of France
Place of birth missing